The discography of the South Korean girl group Lovelyz consists of two studio albums, four live albums, one compilation album, two reissues, seven extended plays, one single album, and twelve singles.

Lovelyz debuted in 2014 with their studio album Girls' Invasion, which was later re-released as Hi~ in 2015. Six months later, they released a first EP, Lovelyz8 (2015) and released a single album Lovelinus, three months later. In 2016, Lovelyz only released their second EP, A New Trilogy. Their second studio album, R U Ready? (2017) was later re-released as Now, We (2017). Six months later, they released a third EP, Fall in Lovelyz (2017). In 2018, their fourth EP, Heal, was released. Seven months later, their fifth EP Sanctuary released. In 2019, their sixth EP, Once Upon a Time was released. A year later, their seventh EP, Unforgettable was released.

Albums

Studio albums

Live albums

Compilation albums

Reissues

Single albums

Extended plays

Singles

As lead artist

Other releases

Other charted songs

Music videos

Notes

References

External links
 

Discography
Discographies of South Korean artists
K-pop music group discographies